Dangerous Paradise is a 1930 American pre-Code drama film directed by William A. Wellman and starring Nancy Carroll, Richard Arlen and Warner Oland.

The film is an adaptation of Joseph Conrad's 1915 novel Victory, with the significant change of a happy ending introduced to the plot which acknowledged a similar change made in the 1919 silent film Victory directed by Maurice Tourneur. As was common in the early years of sound, Dangerous Paradise was remade in several different languages by Paramount at the Joinville Studios in Paris.

Cast
 Nancy Carroll as Alma 
 Richard Arlen as Heyst 
 Warner Oland as Schomberg 
 Gustav von Seyffertitz as Mr. Jones 
 Francis McDonald as Ricardo 
 George Kotsonaros as Pedro 
 Dorothea Wolbert as Mrs. Schomberg 
 Clarence Wilson as Zangiacomo
 Evelyn Selbie as Mrs. Zangiacomo 
 Willie Fung as Wang

References

Bibliography
 Moore, Gene M. Conrad on Film. Cambridge University Press, 2006.

External links

  for the German-language version

1930 films
American drama films
1930 drama films
1930s English-language films
Films directed by William A. Wellman
Paramount Pictures films
Films based on British novels
Films based on works by Joseph Conrad
Films set in Indonesia
Films produced by B. P. Schulberg
American multilingual films
American black-and-white films
1930 multilingual films
1930s American films